*Raidō "ride, journey" is the reconstructed Proto-Germanic name of the r- rune of the Elder Futhark . The name is attested for the same rune in all three rune poems, Old Norwegian Ræið Icelandic Reið, Anglo-Saxon Rad, as well as for the corresponding letter of the Gothic alphabet 𐍂 r, called raida. The shape of the rune may be directly derived from Latin R.

References

External links
Futhark (ancientscripts.com)
Runes around the North Sea and on the Continent AD 150-700 by J. H. Looijenga (dissertation,  Groningen University)

Runes